The Ambassador of Australia to Chile is an officer of the Australian Department of Foreign Affairs and Trade and the head of the Embassy of the Commonwealth of Australia to the Republic of Chile. The ambassador resides in Santiago. The current ambassador, since February 2020, is Todd Mercer.

The post was first established in 1946, and was withdrawn in May 1949, as a cost saving measure by the Australian Government. The post reopened in 1968.

List of heads of mission

References

 
Chile
Australia